Arnold John Bench (14 September 1931 – 1 October 2020) was an Australian rules footballer who played for the Fitzroy Football Club in the Victorian Football League (VFL).

Notes

External links 
		

2020 deaths
1931 births
Australian rules footballers from Victoria (Australia)
Fitzroy Football Club players